The Honeycombs is a canyon containing a series of rock formations located on the eastern shore of Owyhee Lake in Malheur County, Oregon, north of Leslie Gulch.  The area is administered by the Bureau of Land Management, though a nearby campground on Bensley Flat is on Bureau of Reclamation land.

Research Natural Area
The  Honeycombs Research Natural Area is located in the around the Honeycombs. The main plant community is sagebrush/bunchgrass.

Access
The Honeycombs are accessible by boat from Owyhee Lake.  A 4WD road leads to the northeast of them along Juniper Ridge, and further access is by foot following a mustang trail along the ridge to the head of the canyon.

External links
 OSU's Malheur Experiment Station
 Photo Gallery: Honeycombs from the West
 Photo Gallery: Honeycombs by foot
 Honeycombs loop trail

Rock formations of Oregon
Owyhee Desert
Bureau of Land Management areas in Oregon
Landforms of Malheur County, Oregon
Protected areas of Malheur County, Oregon
Canyons and gorges of Oregon